Călățele is a commune in Cluj County, Transylvania, Romania. It is composed of six villages: Călata (Nagykalota), Călățele, Călățele-Pădure, Dealu Negru (Bánffytelep), Finciu (Kalotaújfalu) and Văleni (Magyarvalkó).

Demographics 
According to the census from 2002 there was a total population of 2,671 people living in this commune. Of this population, 80.98% are ethnic Romanians, 10.14% are ethnic Hungarians and 8.64% ethnic Romani.

Natives
Corvin Radovici
Alexandru Roșca

References 

Communes in Cluj County
Localities in Transylvania